Mathieu Bélie (born 20 February 1988 in Toulouse, France) is a French born Spanish rugby union footballer, currently playing for CA Brive in the Top 14. His usual position was at Fly-half, but he now plays at Scrum-half. Prior to joining CA Brive he played for US Montauban and Stade Toulousain where he won the 2007-08 Top 14.

Honours 
 Top 14: 2008 with Stade Toulousain.

External links
ERC stats

1988 births
Living people
French rugby union players
Spanish rugby union players
CA Brive players
Rugby union scrum-halves